Momentum investing is a system of buying stocks or other securities that have had high returns over the past three to twelve months, and selling those that have had poor returns over the same period.

While momentum investing is well-established as a phenomenon no consensus exists about the explanation for this strategy, and economists have trouble reconciling momentum with the efficient market hypothesis and random walk hypothesis. Two main hypotheses have been submitted to explain the momentum effect in terms of an efficient market. In the first, it is assumed that momentum investors bear significant risk for assuming this strategy, and, therefore, the high returns are a compensation for the risk. Momentum strategies often involve disproportionately trading in stocks with high bid-ask spreads and so it is important to take transactions costs into account when evaluating momentum profitability. The second theory assumes that momentum investors are exploiting behavioral shortcomings in other investors, such as investor herding, investor over- and underreaction, disposition effects and confirmation bias.

Seasonal or calendar effects may help to explain some of the reason for success in the momentum investing strategy. If a stock has performed poorly for months leading up to the end of the year, investors may decide to sell their holdings for tax purposes causing for example the January effect. Increased supply of shares in the market drive its price down, causing others to sell. Once the reason for tax selling is eliminated, the stock's price tends to recover.

History
Researchers have identified persistent momentum trends in stock markets as far back as the Victorian Era (ca. 1830s to 1900). Richard Driehaus (1942-2021) is sometimes considered the father of momentum investing but the strategy can be traced back before Donchian. The strategy takes exception with the old stock market adage of buying low and selling high. According to Driehaus, "far more money is made buying high and selling at even higher prices."

In the late 2000s, as computer and networking speeds increase each year, there were many sub-variants of momentum investing being deployed in the markets by computer driven models.  Some of these operate on a very small time scale, such as high-frequency trading, which often execute dozens or even hundreds of trades per second.

Although this is a reemergence of an investing style that was prevalent in the 1990s, ETFs for this style began trading in 2015.

Performance of momentum strategies 
In a study in 1993 Narasimhan Jegadeesh and Sheridan Titman reported that this strategy give average returns of 1% per month for the following 3–12 months. This finding has been confirmed by many other academic studies, some even going back to the 19th century, though momentum strategies are associated with an increased risk of crashes and major losses.

Turnover tend to be high for momentum strategies, which could reduce the net returns of a momentum strategy. Some even claim that transaction costs wipe out momentum profits. In their 2014 study 'fact, fiction, and momentum investing' Cliff Asness and his co-authors address 10 issues with regards to momentum investing, including transaction costs.

The performance of momentum comes with occasional large crashes. For example, in 2009, momentum experienced a crash of -73.42% in three months. This downside risk of momentum can be reduced with a so called 'residual momentum' strategy in which only the stock specific part of momentum is used.

A momentum strategy can also be applied across industries and across markets.

Explanation 
In capital market theory, the momentum factor is one of the most well-known market anomalies. In studies, it has been observed that securities that have risen in recent months tend to continue to do so for a few more months. Depending on which past period was taken as a reference and how long the securities were held thereafter, a different magnitude of effect was observed. The same applies in reverse for securities that have recently fallen in value. One explanation is the so-called post-earnings announcement drift, which assumes that investors initially do not fully price in the higher enterprise value after the announcement of better-than-expected earnings figures. The share price only rises gradually with a delay until the true higher value is only reached after a few months.

Since past price information hereby provides information about future developments and a profitable strategy can be generated from it, the momentum factor is in contradiction to the weak market efficiency. So-called momentum crashes, which usually occur in recovery phases after financial market crashes, are considered to be a risk-based explanation. Most alternative explanations come from behavioral finance.

See also
 Behavioral economics
 Carhart four-factor model
 Investment style
Low-volatility investing
 Market anomaly
 Momentum (finance)
Trend following
Value investing
Post-Earnings-Announcement-Drift

References

Further reading
 Soros, George, 1987, The Alchemy of Finance, Simon and Schuster, New York.
 Tanous, Peter J., 1997, Investment Gurus, New York Institute of Finance, NJ, .
 Antonacci, Gary, 2014, Dual Momentum Investing: An Innovative Approach for Higher Returns with Lower Risk, McGraw-Hill Education, New York, 
 The Definitive Guide To Momentum Investing and Trading, Signal Plot, August 24, 2017
 Hageback, Niklas, 2014, The Mystery of Market Movements: An Archetypal Approach to Investment Forecasting and Modelling, Bloomberg, 

Group processes
Investment